The Rusch Botanical Gardens 2 acres (8,000 m2) are located at 7801 Auburn Boulevard in Citrus Heights, California, United States within Rusch Park. The Rusch Home site dates back to 1858. Originally Gardens were laid out in 1916. Now gardens are a State Site of Historical Interest.  Gardens open daily, dawn to dusk.

Collection 
Gardens represent seven biomes of California and are featuring rose, herb, citrus, and African plants.

See also
 List of botanical gardens in the United States

References 

Botanical gardens in California
Citrus Heights, California
Parks in Sacramento County, California